Valerius Aedituus was a Roman poet of the 1st century BCE. He is known for his epigrams; otherwise there is very little information, what there is being in the form of literary references.

Notes

Ancient Roman poets
Golden Age Latin writers
Latin writers known only from secondary sources
1st-century BC Romans
1st-century BC Roman poets
Valerii